The Juan Agustín Maza University is a private university located in Las Cañas district, Guaymallén department in Mendoza, Argentina. It was founded on May 4, 1960, as a non-for-profit organization.

Schools
 School of Pharmacy and Biochemistry
 School of Nutritional Sciences
 School of Veterinary and Environment Sciences
 School of Journalism
 School of Educational Sciences
 School of Business
 School of Engineering
 School  of Kinesiology and Physical Therapy
 School of Enology and Agribusiness

1960 establishments in Argentina
Universidad Juan Agustin Maza
Engineering universities and colleges in Argentina
Private universities in Argentina